County Line Baptist Church is a historic Southern Baptist church east of Dudleyville, Alabama. The church was first organized on May 2, 1835, in the frontier home of William C. Morgan. Morgan purchased the two-acre site from Creek Indians and contributed it to the church. The current church building on the site was built in 1890, and has been in continuous use and remained virtually unaltered since its construction.

The Church was added to the Alabama Register of Landmarks and Heritage on January 14, 1980, and the National Register of Historic Places on August 19, 1982.

See also
National Register of Historic Places listings in Alabama

References

Churches on the National Register of Historic Places in Alabama
National Register of Historic Places in Chambers County, Alabama
Churches completed in 1889
19th-century Baptist churches in the United States
Baptist churches in Alabama
Churches in Chambers County, Alabama
Properties on the Alabama Register of Landmarks and Heritage
Southern Baptist Convention churches